was a Japanese baseball pitcher.

He played for the Yomiuri Giants and the Hanshin Tigers of Nippon Professional Baseball. Kobayashi coached two other NPB teams, the Osaka Kintetsu Buffaloes and the Hokkaido Nippon-Ham Fighters, and also spent a season in the Korea Baseball Organization as a coach for the SK Wyverns.

He died of heart failure in 2010 at the age of 57.

References

External links

1952 births
2010 deaths
Baseball people from Tottori Prefecture
Japanese baseball players
Nippon Professional Baseball pitchers
SSG Landers coaches
Hanshin Tigers players
Yomiuri Giants players
Japanese expatriate baseball people in South Korea
Japanese baseball coaches
Nippon Professional Baseball coaches